Snippen Station is an unmanned stop on the Gjøvik Line with the address Greveveien in Maridalen, Oslo, Norway. The station is located a little over 17.5 km from Oslo Central Station between Sandermosen Station and Movatn Station and was opened in 1934. There is no car parking area in connection with the station.

The station is conveniently located as a starting point for excursions into both Nordmarka and Lillomarka.

External links 
 Entry at Jernbaneverket 

Railway stations in Oslo
Railway stations on the Gjøvik Line
Railway stations opened in 1934
1934 establishments in Norway
Maridalen